The Indian locomotive class WAG-8 is a class of 25 kV AC electric locomotives that was developed in the early 1990s by Bharat Heavy Electricals Limited (BHEL) for Indian Railways. The model name stands for broad gauge (W), AC current (A), freight/goods traffic (G), eighth-generation (8). Only two units of this class were built, both prototypes.

This class provided the basic design for a number of other locomotives like the WCAM-2, the WCAM-3 and the WCAG-1.

History 
The history of WAG-8 begins in the early 1990s with the aim of addressing the shortcomings of the previous WAG-5  class and remove steam locomotives from IR by a target date of 1990. The WAG-5 though were greatly successes, had become underpowered to meet the growing demands of the Indian Railways. So in the early 1990s BHEL decided to look for a successor to the WAG-5 class. The required specification was of a 5000 horsepower locomotive.

Initially, the Indian railways invited tenders to build locomotives to the new specification. The following responses were received:

 CLW submitted their upgraded WAG-5 model with 5000 hp with Co-Co bogies.
 BHEL submitted a 5000 hp locomotive with thyristors control and  Co-Co bogies

Each company submitted their prototypes and Indian Railways designated these prototypes as the WAG-7 class and WAG-8 class respectively. Development on the WAG-8 class in 1990 while BHEL was also manufacturing WAG-5HS. Technologically the BHEL WAG-8 was meant to be superior to the WAG-7 which was effectively using tap-changer technology from the 1960s. They most likely had the Hitachi HS15250A seen in present day WCAM-3 and WCAG-1.These locos were to be handed it over to Railways for trial in December, 1992, but the whole project was cancelled due to arrival of the WAG-9 and thyristors control had become obsolete to 3 Phase AC technology. The prototype locomotive was subsequently condemned and parked on an unused rail sliding at BHEL, Jhansi.
* This locomotive never went into service on the railway.

See also

Rail transport in India#History
Indian Railways
Locomotives of India
Rail transport in India

References

Notes

Bibliography

External links

Specifications
India railway fan club

Electric locomotives of India
25 kV AC locomotives
Co-Co locomotives
Railway locomotives introduced in 1996
5 ft 6 in gauge locomotives
BHEL locomotives